Santo Tomé (Spanish for Saint Thomas) may refer to the following places:

Argentina
Santo Tomé, Corrientes, a city in the province of Corrientes
Santo Tomé Department, a department in the province of Corrientes
Santo Tomé, Santa Fe, a city in the province of Santa Fe

Spain
Santo Tomé, Jaén, a municipality in the province of Jaén, in the autonomous community of Andalusia
Santo Tomé del Puerto, a municipality in the province of Segovia, in the autonomous community of Castile and León
Santo Tomé de Zabarcos, a municipality in the province of Ávila, in the autonomous community of Castile and León

Venezuela
Santo Tomé de Guayana de Angostura del Orinoco, the former name of Ciudad Bolívar

See also 
São Tomé (disambiguation)